Noinu Thumleima (Meitei pronunciation: nói.nu tʰum.lə́i.mə) or Thumkhong Lairembi is the goddess of salt and salt wells in Meitei mythology and religion of ancient Manipur (Antique Kangleipak). She is a sister (or friend) of the goddesses, Phouoibi (Phouleima), Ngaleima and Ereima (Ireima). People pray to her so there will be enough salt. Salt is an important part of the human diet.

According to the "Recent Researches in Oriental Indological Studies: Including Meiteilogy" by Moirangthem Kirti Singh, the goddess is a wife of Pakhangba, the royal deity.

Etymology 
The Meitei female given name "Thumleima" (tʰum.lə́i.mə, ꯊꯨꯝꯂꯩꯃ) is made of two words. These words are "Thum" (tʰum, ꯊꯨꯝ) and "Leima" (lə́i.mə, ꯂꯩꯃ). In Meitei, "Thum" (tʰum, ꯊꯨꯝ) means salt, usually the common salt. In Meitei, "Leima" (lə́i.mə, ꯂꯩꯃ) means queen, mistress or lady.  

Another name of goddess Thumleima is "Thumkhong Lairembi" (ꯊꯨꯝꯈꯣꯡ ꯂꯥꯢꯔꯦꯝꯕꯤ). The Meitei word "Thumkhong" (tʰum.kʰoŋ, ꯊꯨꯝꯈꯣꯡ) is made up of two component words, "Thum" (tʰum, ꯊꯨꯝ) and "Khong" (kʰoŋ, ꯈꯣꯡ). "Thum" (ꯊꯨꯝ)  means salt. "Khong" (kʰoŋ, ꯈꯣꯡ) means mine (of salt or metallic ores). So, "Thumkhong" (tʰum.kʰoŋ, ꯊꯨꯝꯈꯣꯡ) means salt ditch or salt brine or salt mine or salt well. Another Meitei word "Lairembi" (ꯂꯥꯢꯔꯦꯝꯕꯤ) is made up of three component words, "Lai" (ꯂꯥꯢ), "-rem" (-ꯔꯦꯝ) and "bi" (ꯕꯤ). "Lai" (ꯂꯥꯢ) means "God". "-rem" (-ꯔꯦꯝ) or "-lem" (-ꯂꯦꯝ) means "excellent". "bi" (ꯕꯤ) or "pi" (ꯄꯤ) is a suffix to denote feminine gender. So, "Lairembi" (ꯂꯥꯢꯔꯦꯝꯕꯤ) means a goddess.

Association with other goddesses 
Thumleima is one of the divine manifestations of Leimarel (Leimalel). Leimalel is the supreme mother earth goddess. It is said that Leimalel becomes Thumleima when she is in the salt mine. Thumleima is also considered as one of the divine incarnations of goddess Imoinu.

In popular culture 
 Phou-oibi, the rice goddess is a 2009 ballad opera. It was performed by the Laihui Ensemble. It is based on the story of the goddess and her sister Phouoibi.
 Phouoibi Shayon is a 2017 Manipuri mythology movie based on the story of the goddess and her sister Phouoibi.

See also 
 Panthoibi, Meitei goddess of civilization, love, and warfare

References

External links 

 Noinu Thumleima_English Wikisource
 Thumleima_archive.org

Abundance deities
Abundance goddesses
Beauty deities
Beauty goddesses
Commerce deities
Commerce goddesses
Domestic and hearth deities
Domestic and hearth goddesses
Fertility deities
Fertility goddesses
Food deities
Food goddesses
Fortune deities
Fortune goddesses
Health deities
Health goddesses
Leima
Life-death-rebirth deities
Life-death-rebirth goddesses
Love and lust deities
Love and lust goddesses
Magic deities
Magic goddesses
Maintenance deities
Maintenance goddesses
Meitei deities
Names of God in Sanamahism
Peace deities
Peace goddesses
Time and fate deities
Time and fate goddesses